The Russian First League 1994 was the 3rd edition of Russian First Division. It was the first season after conversion from 3 zones in the First League into one zone of 22 teams.

Overview

Standings

Top goalscorers 

35 goals

 Dmitri Silin (FC Baltika Kaliningrad)

32 goals

 Aleksandr Maslov (FC Rostselmash Rostov-on-Don)

30 goals

 Sergei Burdin (FC Chernomorets Novorossiysk)

24 goals

 Dmitri Vyazmikin (FC Torpedo Vladimir)

21 goals

 Sergei Toporov (FC Zarya Leninsk-Kuznetsky)
  Valeriy Yablochkin (FC Shinnik Yaroslavl)

19 goals

 Khazret Dyshekov (FC Chernomorets Novorossiysk)

17 goals

 Lev Matveyev (FC Zvezda Perm)

16 goals

 Leonid Markevich (FC Sokol Saratov)
 Yevgeni Yastrebinskiy (FC Uralan Elista)

See also
Russian Top League 1994
Russian Second League 1994
Russian Third League 1994

2
Russian First League seasons
Russia
Russia